This is a list of the gymnasts who represented their country at the 1980 Summer Olympics in Moscow from 19 July to 3 August 1980. Only one discipline, artistic gymnastics, was included in the Games.

Female artistic gymnasts

Male artistic gymnasts

References 

Lists of gymnasts
Gymnastics at the 1980 Summer Olympics